The 1991–92 Southwest Missouri State Bears basketball team represented Southwest Missouri State University in National Collegiate Athletic Association (NCAA) Division I men's basketball during the 1991–92 season. Playing in the Missouri Valley Conference and led by head coach Charlie Spoonhour, the Bears finished the season with a 23–8 overall record and finished third in the MVC regular season standings. After winning the MVC tournament to gain an automatic bid to the NCAA tournament, Southwest Missouri State lost to Michigan State in the opening round.

Roster

Schedule and results

|-
!colspan=9 style=| Regular season

|-
!colspan=9 style=| Missouri Valley Conference tournament

|-
!colspan=10 style=| NCAA tournament

References

Missouri State Bears basketball seasons
Southwest Missouri State
Southwest Missouri State
Missouri State Bears Basketball Team
Missouri State Bears Basketball Team